Han Li or Hon Lik is a Chinese pharmacist who invented the modern electronic cigarette.

Early life
Hon Lik (or Han Li) was born in Shenyang, China in 1956. He started smoking at age 18. He attended Liaoning University of Traditional Chinese Medicine and graduated with a pharmaceutical degree. He joined the Liaoning Academy of Traditional Chinese Medicine in 1982.

Career

From 1990 to 1994, Hon Lik was the Deputy Director of Liaoning Academy of Traditional Chinese Medicine, in charge of research and development of new botanical drugs.  In 2003, he become Director of Western Technologies Corp.

He was a co-founder of Dragonite International Limited, a Hong Kong company in health care, pharmaceuticals, and electronic cigarettes. Hon was Dragonite's Chief Executive Officer and Director for eight years.

Golden Dragon Group purchased Dragonite in 2007. Golden Dragon Group sold Hon's e-cigarette invention to Imperial Tobacco, the "tobacco giant" in Britain, in 2013.

Hon sees the e-cigarette as comparable to the "digital camera taking over from the analog camera." He has said, "My fame will follow the development of the e-cigarette industry. Maybe in 20 or 30 years I will be very famous." Hon said "I really hope that the large international pharmaceutical groups get into manufacturing electronic cigarettes and that authorities like the FDA in the United States will continue to impose stricter and stricter standards so that the product will be as safe as possible."

Invention of the e-cigarette 
Hon's original goal was to help himself quit smoking cigarettes. Ultimately, this did not work. He is now a dual user, both smoking and vaping.

He filed patents on his invention in China, the United States and the European Union based on his 2003 priority application in China.  The first electronic cigarette was manufactured in 2004 in Shenyang, China, and was called "Ruyan." The Ruyan had the same system used today: aerosolized liquid through a heating element powered by a battery.

He is now working on another product, the "e-hookah", to be sold in the Middle Eastern and North African markets.

References

Chinese inventors
1951 births
Chinese pharmacists
Businesspeople from Shenyang
Electronic cigarette manufacturers
Living people